The Complex of Silesian International Schools, founded in 2007 in Katowice, is an International Centre of University of Cambridge International Examinations (CIE). Prywatne Liceum Ogolnoksztalcace im. Melchiora Wankowicza, which is a part of the Complex, offers the International Baccalaureate (IB) Diploma Programme.

Curriculum
The Complex offers a curriculum for students aged 3–19 in Cambridge Primary, Checkpoint, IGCSE and IB Diploma Programmes. The language of instruction on all levels is English, but the school strongly emphasises other languages, such as Polish, Spanish and German.

External links 
Complex of Silesian International Schools website

British international schools
International Baccalaureate schools in Poland